Orient Beach State Park is a  state park located in Southold, New York. The park is situated at the tip of the North Fork of Long Island.

Long Beach, located within the park, was designated a National Natural Landmark in April 1980 for its  sand spit beach demonstrating plant succession from salt marsh to maritime red cedar forest.

The Orient Long Beach Bar Light, commonly known as Bug Light, is located inside the park.

Recreation

The park offers  of bay frontage, and includes a beach, picnic tables with pavilions, a playground, recreation programs, a nature trail, hiking and biking (rentals available), fishing and a food concession. The park is open throughout the year for day-use only.

Restrictions on boat access
In 1997, park rangers began enforcing an existing no boating policy on Long Beach, leading to controversy and ticketing in 2000. State officials contended that renewed enforcement was enacted to protect the beach's value as a protected sanctuary for endangered birds such as the piping plover, in addition to preserving the beach's unusual maritime red cedar forest and other rare plants.

Flora and fauna
There is a common and roseate tern nesting area in the park. There are also eelgrass beds offshore.

See also
 List of New York state parks
 List of National Natural Landmarks in New York

References

External links

 New York State Parks: Orient Beach State Park

State parks of New York (state)
Robert Moses projects
National Natural Landmarks in New York (state)
Southold, New York
Parks in Suffolk County, New York
1929 establishments in New York (state)
Protected areas established in 1929